Eudonia nectarioides is a moth of the family Crambidae described by Otto Herman Swezey in 1913. It is endemic to the island of Hawaii.

External links

Eudonia
Endemic moths of Hawaii
Moths described in 1913